Panithuli is a 2012 Tamil-language action film directed by Natty Kumar and Dr. Jay, starring Ganesh Venkatraman, Kalpana Pandit and Shobana. The film was released on 10 August 2012. It received a lot of negative reviews. The film was shot in Hindi as Tum Ho Yaara which was released in 2014. The Tamil version's title is inspired by a song from Kanda Naal Mudhal (2005).

Cast
 Ganesh Venkatraman as Shiva
 Kalpana Pandit as Maya
 Shobana as Meera
 Sreedharan Karthikeyan as Balu
 Narayan Sundararajan as Arun
 Thirumudi Thulasiraman as Rajaraman
 Natty Kumar as Veeraswamy
 Cliff Janke as Winston

Soundtrack
The soundtrack was composed by debutants Agnel Roman, and Faisal, and lyrics were written by Nawin Seetharaman, Thendral Ramkumar, Ashok Subramaniam, and Dr. Jay.
"Azhagu Rakshasa" — Vinaitha Sivakumar
"Kallakku" — Pragathi Guruprasad
"Kan Parpathu" — Srinivas
"Oru Pudhu Vaanam" — Thendral Ramkumar
"Pasiyaa Thookkama" - Savi Suresh, Naresh Iyer
"Uyirin" — Jayadev, Surmukhi Raman

Reception
Behindwoods wrote, "On the whole, Panithuli is just a less impressive portfolio for Ganesh Venkatraman, who has tried to show us that he can carry the roles of an action hero, a lover boy and a mentally unstable man." The Hindu wrote "Panithuli is an example of how a simple story can be made complicated. To ensure that his film isn’t labelled run-of-the-mill, director Natty Kumar has added several episodes to a simple plot. But instead of making the film interesting, they have only turned it into a long and dreary affair." Rediff wrote "On the face of it, Panithuli, has the potential to be an edge-of-the-seat thriller. What it is, however, is a mishmash of terribly stereotyped characters trying in vain to mould themselves to suit a surreal landscape. The result leaves you laughing and yawning by turns". Sify wrote "The romantic thriller is supposed to be full of suspense and twists but at the end it leaves you totally confused and bewildered as the hero character in the film. Kumar and Jay embarked on making a typical M Night Shyamalan movie, but ends up with egg on their face".

References

External links
 
 

2012 action thriller films
2012 films
2010s Tamil-language films
Indian action thriller films
Indian multilingual films
2012 multilingual films